Das Blaue Palais is a series of five TV feature films written and directed by German author and filmmaker . All five stories  about the research and findings of an interdisciplinary scientific project have also been published as novels by Goldmann in 1978 ("Das Genie"), 1979 ("Das Medium", "Unsterblichkeit", "Der Verräter") and 1980 ("Der Gigant"). The series had an international cast. It was shot in Bavaria, Scotland, the United States and Asia.

Cast

Overview of all episodes

External links
  (Das Genie)
  (Der Verräter)
  (Das Medium)
  (Unsterblichkeit)
  (Der Gigant)

German science fiction television series
1974 German television series debuts
1976 German television series endings
1970s German television miniseries
German-language television shows
ZDF original programming